This is a list of historical individuals notable for their pagan religion, and modern individuals who self-describe as adherents of some form of paganism or neopaganism.

Ancient

Arabic 
Pagans among the Arabic peoples

 Amr ibn Hishām, pagan leader
 Epiphanius of Petra, pagan sophist and rhetorician
 Theodora of Emesa, neoplatonist
 Umayyah ibn Khalaf, pagan leader
 Utbah ibn Rabi'ah, pagan leader

Baltic
Historic Baltic pagans:
 Algirdas (died 1377), Lithuanian grand prince
 Kęstutis, brother of Algirdas, killed 1382, for some time held title of grand prince of Lithuania after Algirdas' death
 Nameisis (died after 1281), Semigallian duke
 Viestards (died 1230), Semigallian duke
 Vytautas the Great, grand duke of Lithuania and son of Kęstutis, baptized with his cousin Jogaila in 1386
 Jogaila, king of Poland, baptized in 1386 and renamed Władysław II Jagiełło. Together with Vytautas they are the last pagan monarchs of Europe. He gave his name to the Jagiellon branch of Gediminids – one of largest dynasties in medieval Europe.

Celtic
Pagans among the ancient Celtic peoples (Roman Gaul, Roman Britain, Ireland)

Historic Celtic pagans:
Caratacus (born  10 AD), chieftain of the Catuvellauni tribe which led the British resistance to the Roman Conquest
Boudica (born c. 30 AD–60 AD) Celtic warrior queen of the Iceni tribe who fought against the Roman oppression of Britain
Niall of the Nine Hostages (died c. 405), according to legend kidnapped St. Patrick as a youth
Radagaisus (died 406)
Lóegaire mac Néill (fl. c. 440s), according to Muirchu moccu Machtheni a "great, fierce, pagan emperor of the barbarians reigning in Tara"
 Lughaid mac Loeguire (died c. 507)
 Diarmait mac Cerbaill (died 585), according to Irish tradition the last high king of Ireland to follow the pagan rituals of inauguration
 Gwenc'hlan, legendary as the last Breton bard and druid

Egyptian

Horapollo, 5th-century Egyptian pagan writer

Germanic
Historic Germanic pagans:
 Albruna, Germanic seeress, prophetess, soothsayer
 Aoric, Gothic pagan
 Arbogast (died 394), Frankish general who tried to revive paganism in the Roman Empire
 Ariaric, Gothic pagan
 Arwald (died 686), last pagan ruler of the Isle of Wight, or any Anglo-Saxon kingdom
 Atharid, Gothic pagan
 Audofleda, pagan Gothic queen until her marriage
 Athanaric (died 381), king of several branches of the Thervings for at least two decades in the 4th century
 Björn Eriksson, king of Sweden
 Blot-Sweyn, leader of the Swedish pagan renaissance in the 11th century
 Coifi, priest of the temple at Goodmanham in the Kingdom of Northumbria in 627
 Dagalaifus, pagan of Germanic descent who served as consul in 366
 Eadbald (died 640), king of Kent
 Eanfrith (590–634), king of Bernicia from 633 to 634 who reverted to paganism after becoming king
 Ecgric (died c. 636), East Anglian king of an independent kingdom
 Emund Eriksson, Swedish king
 Eric of Good Harvests (died c. 1081), semi-historical successor to Blot-Sweyn, and the last pagan king in Scandinavia
 Erik Ringsson, Swedish king and the son of Ring
 Eric the Victorious (born c. 945 - died c. 995), Swedish monarch who became Christian but later reverted to paganism
 Fravitta, pagan chieftain of the Visigoths
 Ganna, Germanic prophetess and priestess (Seherin) of the Semnones tribe and a predecessor of Veleda
 Gandalf Alfgeirsson, legendary king of the petty kingdom Alfheim, in south-eastern Norway and south-western Sweden He is portrayed in Snorri Sturluson's saga Heimskringla.
 Gibuld (fl. c. 470), king of the Alamanni who freed hostages on the request of Saint Severinus of Noricum
 Hermeric (died 441), king of the Suevi in Galicia
 Haakon Sigurdsson (c. 937 – 995), de facto ruler of Norway from about 975 to 995 who was in favor of Norse paganism
 Palnetoke, legendary pagan foster-father of Sweyn's
 Peada of Mercia (died 656), son of Penda and a pagan until his conversion
 Penda of Mercia (died 655), one of the last pagan Anglo-Saxon rulers of England
 Radagaisus, pagan Gothic king
 Redbad, last independent ruler of Frisia
 Ragnachar, Frankish pagan petty king
 Rechila, Suevic King of Galicia from 438 until his death
 Ricberht, East Anglian king of an independent kingdom
 Ring, Swedish king
 Sæward, brother of Sexred
 Sexred (died 626?), pagan king of the East Saxons who refused to accept Christianity, openly practiced paganism and gave permission to his subjects to worship their idols
 Sigeberht the Little, king of Essex
 Sigehere (died c. 688), joint king of the Kingdom of Essex along with his cousin Sæbbi
 Sigrid the Haughty, first wife of Eric the Victorious
 Sweyn Forkbeard (died 1014), pagan king of Denmark
 Swithhelm, pagan king of Essex but converted to Christianity in 662
 Tytila (died c. 616), semi-historical pagan king of East Anglia
 Veleda, priestess and prophetess of the Bructeri tribe
 Waluburg, Semnonian seeress in the service of the governor of Roman Egypt
 Wehha, king of the East Angles
 Widukind (died 808), pagan Saxon leader and the chief opponent of Charlemagne during the Saxon Wars
 Wingurich, Gothic pagan
 Wuffa, king of the East Angles

Graeco-Roman
Historic Graeco-Roman pagans:
 Alexander the Great, king of the ancient Greek kingdom of Macedon and conqueror of Achaemenid Persia, with his death marking the start of the Hellenistic period. Alexander became legendary as a classical hero in the mold of Achilles, featuring prominently in the historical and mythical traditions of both Greek and non-Greek cultures.
 Hadrian (76–138), completed the Temple of Olympian Zeus and was noted for strengthening ties between the Roman and Greek pantheons
 Lucian of Samosata, writer and satirist
 Decius, emperor who made efforts to increase public piety. Required sacrifices on his behalf which led to execution for those who refused, mostly non-pagans. 
 Diocletian, emperor noted for his piety and pagan views. Persecuted and executed Manicheans and Christians in an effort to  support the Roman state religion. 
 Galerius, emperor who strongly supported Roman paganism. Thought to have been the primary driver behind the Diocletian persecutions of Manicheans and Christians in defense of Roman religion.
 Porphyry, neoplatonist philosopher who argued strongly in favor of Roman paganism and opposed the rise of Christianity. Also wrote many treatises on Roman paganism and is attributed as the author of many more that are of more uncertain origin.
 Iamblichus of Chalcis, disciple of Porphyry
 Ammianus Marcellinus, 4th-century historian
 Maurus Servius Honoratus, 4th-century grammarian
 Julian (ruled 361–363), attempted to re-establish Roman paganism, initiating a "pagan revival" among a number of families of the Roman elite
 Alypius of Antioch
 Vettius Agorius Praetextatus (died 384)
 Virius Nicomachus Flavianus (334–394)
 Quintus Aurelius Symmachus (c. 340 – c. 402), Roman senator who attempted to have the altar of Altar of Victory restored
 Hypatia of Alexandria, neoplatonist philosopher, mathematician and astronomer, killed in 415 by a Christian mob
 Nicomachus Flavianus (died after 432)
 Eunapius, last hierophant of Eleusis
 Martianus Capella, 5th-century author
 Proclus (died 485), neoplatonist philosopher
 Zosimus, 5th-century Byzantine historian
 Damascius (c. 480 – died after 533), "the last of the neoplatonists" 
 Gemistus Pletho, 15th-century Byzantine philosopher
 Salutius, 4th-century author of the treatise On the Gods and the Cosmos for Hellenic paganism
 Rutilius Claudius Namatianus (died after 416), Roman imperial poet

Slavic
Christianization of the Slavs took place from the 7th to 12th centuries, with a pagan reaction in Poland in the 1030s and conversion of the Polabian Slavs by the 1180s (see Wendish Crusade).
 Porga of Croatia (died 660), last pagan ruler of the Principality of Dalmatian Croatia
 Vlastimir of Serbia (died 851), last pagan ruler of the first Serbian principality
 Presian I of Bulgaria (died 852), last pagan ruler of the Bulgarian Empire
 Sviatoslav I of Kiev (died 972)
 Yaropolk I of Kiev (died 980), last pagan ruler of the Kievan Rus
 Mstivoj (died 995), leader of the Slavic revolt against Otto II, Holy Roman Emperor
 Niklot (died 1160), leader of the Obotrites

Turko-Mongolic
 Attila
 Bayan I
 Asparuh
 Krum
 Genghis Khan
 Abaqa Khan

Hungarian
 Árpád
 Géza
 Koppány
 Vata

Modern

Baltic 
 Bīne, Jēkabs, Latvian artist
 Brastiņš, Arvīds, Latvian sculptor and writer
 Brastiņš, Ernests, founder of the neopagan organization Dievturība
 Brikmanis, Jānis, zoologist, environmental conservationist, radio and television presenter, and writer
 Celms, Valdis, leader of the neopagan organization Latvijas Dievtuŗu sadraudze
 Eglītis, Viktors, Latvian writer
 Trinkūnas, Jonas, founder and the former high priest of the Lithuanian pagan society Romuva, husband of Inija Trinkūnienė
 Trinkūnienė, Inija, current high priestess of the Lithuanian pagan society Romuva, wife of Jonas Trinkūnas
 Vaiškūnas, Jonas, Lithuanian physicist, museologist and publisher
 Vējonis, Raimonds, president of Latvia
 Vīka, Hilda, Latvian artist and writer
 Vydūnas, Lithuanian writer and philosopher

Germanic
Germanic neopagans include:

 Aswynn, Freya, Dutch writer and musician
 Christensen, Else, Odinist Fellowship
 Eyvindur P. Eiríksson, Icelandic writer, Íslenska Ásatrúarfélagið
 Fahrenkrog, Ludwig, German artist and writer
 Flowers, Stephen, American writer and scholar
 Frenssen, Gustav, German novelist
 Gaahl, Norwegian musician
 Grundy, Stephan, American writer and scholar
 Gunnhildur Hauksdóttir, Icelandic artist, Íslenska Ásatrúarfélagið
 Günther, Hans F. K., German writer
 Hauer, Jakob Wilhelm, German Faith Movement
 Haugen, Andrea, German musician
 Haukur Halldórsson, Icelandic artist, Íslenska Ásatrúarfélagið
 Heimgest, Odinic Rite
 Hilmar Örn Hilmarsson, Íslenska Ásatrúarfélagið
 Heinrich Himmler, leader of the Schutzstaffel (Nazi SS)
 Jón frá Pálmholti, Icelandic poet
 Jónína Kristín Berg, Íslenska Ásatrúarfélagið
 Jörmundur Ingi Hansen, Íslenska Ásatrúarfélagið
 Logghe, Koenraad
 Ludendorff, Erich, German general
 Ludendorff, Mathilde, German psychiatrist
 Lyngvild, Jim, Danish designer, writer, fashion columnist and television personality
 McNallen, Stephen, Asatru Folk Assembly
 Mills, Alexander Rud, Odinism
 Moondog, American musician and poet
 Moynihan, Michael Jenkins, American publisher and musician
 Neményi, Géza von, Germanische Glaubens-Gemeinschaft
 Paxson, Diana, science fiction author, editor of Idunna, the quarterly journal of the Troth
 Raes, Roeland, Flemish politician
 Read, Ian, English musician
 Reventlow, Ernst, German Faith Movement
 Rosenberg, Alfred, leader of the Nazi Foreign Policy Office
 Rudgley, Richard, British author and television presenter
 Seigfried, Karl E. H., American musician and writer
 Sprouse, Dylan, actor, The Suite Life of Zack & Cody
 Svarte, Askr, Russian activist
 Sveinbjörn Beinteinsson, Íslenska Ásatrúarfélagið
 Tauring, Kari, American musician
 Tveitt, Geirr, Norwegian composer
 Varg Vikernes, Norwegian black metal musician and writer
 Wakeford, Tony, English musician

Greek
Fransham, John, English eccentric, tutor and author
Kalentzis, Aristotelis, Greek national socialist horseback archery instructor and author
Rassias, Vlassis, Greek writer and founder of the Supreme Council of Ethnic Hellenes

Neo-druidism

Neo-druids include:

 Berthou, Gwilherm, Breton poet
 Bonewits, Isaac, author and scholar of several Druid and neopagan related books and articles
 Carr-Gomm, Philip, former chosen chief of the Order of Bards, Ovates, and Druids
 D'Ambrosio, Ossian, founder of Antica Quercia and Cerchio Druidico Italiano
 Hutton, Ronald, scholar of British history; professor at University of Bristol, and author of books on the history of neopaganism
 Le Scouëzec, Gwenc'hlan, Goursez Vreizh
 Marchal, Morvan, Breton architect and activist
 Pendragon, Arthur, leader of the Loyal Arthurian Warband, self-declared reincarnation of King Arthur
 Nichols, Ross, founder of the Order of Bards, Ovates, and Druids
 Paredes, Xoán, Irmandade Druídica Galaica
 Restall Orr, Emma, Druid priestess, author, founder of the Druid Network
 Shallcrass, Philip, current head of the British Druid Order
 Tullou, Raffig, Breton sculptor and set designer

Roman
 Armentano, Amedeo Rocco, Italian esotericist and musician
 Boni, Giacomo, Italian archeologist
 Musmeci Ferrari Bravo, Roggero, Italian poet and playwright
 Reghini, Arturo, Italian mathematician, philosopher and esotericist

Slavic
 Antonych, Bohdan Ihor, Ukrainian poet
 Arkhipova, Maria, Russian musician
 Biletsky, Andriy, Ukrainian politician
 Chodakowski, Zorian Dołęga, Polish ethnographer
 Harlender, Zdzisław, Polish pilot, army officer and writer
 Kołodziej, Władysław, pioneer of modern paganism in Poland
 Potrzebowski, Stanisław, Rodzima Wiara
 Povetkin, Alexander, Russian professional boxer
 Shaian, Volodymyr, Ukrainian linguist and philologist
 Stachniuk, Jan, Zadruga
 Veleslav, Russian Rodnover priest

Turko-Mongolic
 Atsız, Nihal, Turkish Tengrist ideologist and writer
 Bira, Shagdaryn, Mongolian academician of the Academy of Sciences and historian
 Gurkin, Grigory, Altaian painter and politician
 Kenin-Lopsan, Mongush, Tuvan anthropologist and religious leader
 Sarygulov, Dastan, Kyrgyz politician and founder of Tengir Ordo
 Suleimenov, Olzhas, Kazakh poet and Turkologist
 Tschinag, Galsan, Tuvan-Mongolian writer, activist, and shaman

Wicca
Wiccans include:

 Adler, Margot, author, journalist, Wiccan priestess and elder, National Public Radio correspondent in New York City
 Baudino, Gael, author, mostly fantasy (Dianic Wiccan)
 Beyerl, Paul, founder of the Rowan Tree Church
 Bone, Gavin, Wiccan author and lecturer
 Buckland, Raymond, author of Buckland's Complete Book of Witchcraft and many others, and founder of Seax-Wica
 Budapest, Z., pagan teacher and writer  (Dianic Wicca)
 Cabot, Laurie, official witch of Salem, author of Power of the Witch and Love Magic
 Close, Del, considered one of the premier influences on modern improvisational theater.
 Cunningham, Scott, author of Wicca: A Guide for the Solitary Practitioner and over 30 other titles on Wicca and other pagan religions
 Dunwich, Gerina, author of Wicca Craft and other books on the details of spellwork
 Erna, Sully, lead singer of Godsmack
 Fallingstar, Cerridwen, author of The Heart of the Fire
 Farrar, Janet, author
 Farrar, Stewart, author
 Firefox, LaSara, author
 Frost, Gavin and Frost, Yvonne, founders of the Church and School of Wicca
 Galenorn, Yasmine, author of Embracing the Moon and Dancing the Sun
 Gardner, Gerald, founder of modern Wicca
 Grimassi, Raven, author on Stregheria and family witchcraft
 Horne, Fiona, author of Witch: A Personal Journey and other books on Wicca
 Inkubus Sukkubus, musical group
 Lipp, Deborah, author of books on Wicca
 Martello, Leo, American author
 Mayhem, Monica, Australian author, singer, model, actress and retired pornographic actress
 McCollum, Patrick, Wiccan prison chaplain
 Modrzyk, Stanley, author of books on Wicca
 Omnia, musical group
 Queen, Carol, author, editor, sociologist and sexologist
 Ravenwolf, Silver, controversial Wiccan author and contributor to the New Generation of Wicca and part of the Black Forest Clan
 Sanders, Alex, founder of the Alexandrian tradition of Wicca
 Sanders, Maxine, co-founder of the Alexandrian tradition
 Valiente, Doreen, author and contemporary of Gardner
 Curott, Phyllis, shamanic Wiccan. Founder of the tradition of Ara and author of Book of Shadows, WitchCrafting, and The Love Spell.

Various or unspecified

 Adunis, Syrian poet
 Ra Un Nefer Amen, Kemetism
 Kenneth Anger, American filmmaker and writer
 Anzori Barkalaja, Estonian folklorist, Maavalla Koda
 Alain de Benoist, French writer and publisher
 Manfred Böckl, German writer, Celtic paganism in Bavaria
 Granny Boswell, notable Cornish witch
 Cau, Jean, French writer and journalist
 Aki Cederberg, Finnish writer, musician and filmmaker
 Kalle Eller, Estonian publisher and poet, Maavalla Koda
 Selena Fox, one of the founders of Circle Sanctuary
 Christopher Gérard, Belgian writer and critic
 Marian Green, author, founder of Quest Conference and journal, former editor of Pagan Dawn and former member of the Pagan Federation Council
 Graham Harvey, English religious studies scholar
 Andres Heinapuu, Estonian bibliographer and politician, Maavalla Koda
 Sigrid Hunke, German writer
 Paul Huson, author of Mastering Witchcraft, Mystical Origins of the Tarot, and other titles
 Thibault Isabel, French writer and publisher
 Patricia Kennealy-Morrison – Celtic pagan high priestess, rock critic, author of The Keltiad series of science fiction/fantasy novels, and Strange Days – My Life With and Without Jim Morrison
 Ludwig Klages, German philosopher
 Sharon Knight, Celtic / rock musician, songwriter, producer; front person of the pagan rock band Pandemonaeon; Feri initiate
 Marta Lepp, Estonian writer and teacher
 Jean-François Lyotard, French philosopher
 Jeff McBride, American magician
 Addold Mossin, Estonian activist, Maavalla Koda
 Baal Müller, German writer and publisher
 Fernando Pessoa, Portuguese writer
 Eric Steven Raymond, programmer and author of The Hacker's Dictionary and How to Be a Hacker
 Hugues Rebell, French writer
 Maurice Rollet, French poet, activist and medical doctor
 Paolo Rustichelli, eclectic composer
 Sexton, John W., Irish poet
 Starhawk, activist, anarchist and author of The Spiral Dance, Dreaming the Dark, Webs of Power, etc.; one of the original members of the Reclaiming Collective
 Dominique Venner, French historian, journalist and essayist
 York, Michael, American scholar
 Oberon Zell-Ravenheart, Church of All Worlds
 Morning Glory Zell-Ravenheart, Church of All Worlds

See also
 List of druids and neo-druids
 List of neopagan movements
 Lists of people by belief

References

 
Pagans
 
Modern paganism-related lists